Jennifer Jean "Jenna" von Oÿ  (born May 2, 1977) is an American actress, singer and author. She played the role of Dorothy "Six" LeMeure in the NBC sitcom Blossom and Stevie Van Lowe in the UPN sitcom The Parkers, the spin-off series of Moesha.

Early life and career

Von Oÿ was born in Danbury, Connecticut, to Gloria and Frank Von Oÿ. She attended Newtown High School and began her acting career as a child in regional stage productions and commercials. Von Oÿ made her television acting debut in 1986 in an episode of ABC Weekend Special, which was followed by guest roles on Tales from the Darkside and Kate & Allie. From 1990 to 1991, she co-starred in the short-lived CBS sitcom Lenny.

From 1990 to 1995, von Oÿ appeared in the role of the fast-talking Six Lemeure in the series Blossom. After the series ended, she attended film school at the University of Southern California and was an active member of the Kappa Alpha Theta sorority for two years before dropping out to return to acting. In 1999, she won the role of Stevie van Lowe, Kim Parker (Countess Vaughn)'s sidekick in The Parkers. 

During the run of The Parkers, von Oÿ also provided the voice of Trinket St. Blaire in the animated series Pepper Ann. After The Parkers ended its run in 2004, von Oÿ appeared in the 2005 television film, Marsha Potter Gets a Life. Later that year, she guest-starred in an episode of Cold Case and parodied Alexis Bledel's character Rory Gilmore in the Family Guy episode "Perfect Castaway".

In addition to television, von Oÿ has also appeared in the feature film Born on the Fourth of July (1989) opposite Tom Cruise. She has also provided the voices of Stacey in A Goofy Movie (1995) and Gracie in the direct-to-DVD feature Dr. Dolittle 3 (2006). 

In June 2000, von Oÿ recorded a demo compact disc in an attempt to launch a recording career in country music. Her debut album, Breathing Room, was released on September 18, 2007.

Personal life
She married computer-data consultant Brad Bratcher in Newtown, Connecticut, in October 2010  but the couple has since divorced. They have two daughters: Gray Audrey Bratcher, who was born on May 21, 2012; and Marlowe Monroe Bratcher, who was born on November 1, 2014.

Von Oÿ has resided in Nashville for 15 years, where she lives with her partner, two daughters, and 5 dogs. She currently works as the associate editor and lead Nashville writer for Nashville-based lifestyle publication StyleBlueprint.

Discography

 Breathing Room (2007) 
 Coffee & Men (An EP for Childish Adults) (2009)

Filmography

Awards and nominations

References

External links
 
 

1977 births
Living people
Actresses from Stamford, Connecticut
American child actresses
American country singer-songwriters
American film actresses
American people of German descent
American television actresses
American voice actresses
American women country singers
LGBT actresses
Musicians from Stamford, Connecticut
USC School of Cinematic Arts alumni
Country musicians from Connecticut
Singer-songwriters from Connecticut
20th-century American actresses
21st-century American actresses